The 2018 SWAC women's soccer tournament was the postseason women's soccer tournament for the Southwestern Athletic Conference held November 1–4, 2018. The seven-match tournament took place at the Prairie View A&M Soccer Stadium in Prairie View, Texas. The eight-team single-elimination tournament consisted of three rounds based on seeding from regular season conference play. The defending champions were the Alabama State Hornets, however they were unable to defend their title, losing 1–0 to the Grambling State Tigers in the Semifinals.  The eventual champions were the Howard Bison, who defeated Grambling State 1–0 in the final. The conference tournament title was the third in the history of the Howard women's soccer program, all of which have come under the direction of head coach Brent Leiba.

Bracket

Source:

Schedule

Quarterfinals

Semifinals

Final

Statistics

Goalscorers 
2 Goals
 Begona Bravo – Texas Southern
 Jordan Taylor – Howard

1 Goal
 Florence David – Grambling State
 Kalley Pena – Grambling State
 Birgit Rijnders – Alabama State
 Jasmine Smith – Grambling State
 Brittany Terry – Grambling State

All-Tournament team

Source:

References 

Southwestern Athletic Conference Women's Soccer Tournament
2018 Southwestern Athletic Conference women's soccer season